Pipestone is an unincorporated community in central Alberta in the County of Wetaskiwin No. 10.

Education
Wetaskiwin Regional Division No. 11 operates public schools. Pipestone School serves grades Kindergarten-6, while Pigeon Lake Regional School serves Pipestone for grades 7-12.

References

Localities in the County of Wetaskiwin No. 10